Deckard-Y is an unincorporated community in Oregon County, in the U.S. state of Missouri.

A community called "Deckard" was named after Kellis Deckard, a local tradesman.

References

Unincorporated communities in Oregon County, Missouri
Unincorporated communities in Missouri